Minuscule 774 (in the Gregory-Aland numbering), ε194 (von Soden), is a Greek minuscule manuscript of the New Testament written on parchment. Palaeographically it has been assigned to the 11th century. The manuscript has complex contents. Scrivener labelled it as 869e.
It has marginalia and liturgical books.

Description 
The codex contains the text of the four Gospels, on 370 parchment leaves (size ). The text is written in one column per page, 20 lines per page.

There is also another division according to the smaller Ammonian Sections (in Mark 234 Sections, the last 16:9), with references to the Eusebian Canons (written below Ammonian Section numbers).

Text 
The Greek text of the codex is a representative of the Byzantine text-type. Hermann von Soden classified it to the textual family Kx. Aland placed it in Category V.

According to the Claremont Profile Method it represent the textual family Kx in Luke 1, Luke 10, and Luke 20.

History 
F. H. A. Scrivener dated the manuscript to the 11th/12th century; Gregory dated the manuscript to the 12th century. The manuscript is currently dated by the INTF to the 11th century.

Formerly the manuscript was held in monasteries in Constantinople, as codices 87 and 178.

The manuscript was noticed in catalogue from 1876.

It was added to the list of New Testament manuscripts by Scrivener (869) and Gregory (774). Gregory saw the manuscript in 1886.

The manuscript is now housed at the National Library of Greece (57) in Athens.

See also 

 List of New Testament minuscules
 Biblical manuscript
 Textual criticism
 Minuscule 773

References

Further reading 

 

Greek New Testament minuscules
11th-century biblical manuscripts
Manuscripts of the National Library of Greece